The Parker Slate is a geologic formation in Vermont. It preserves fossils dating back to the Cambrian period.

See also

 Emmonsaspis
 List of fossiliferous stratigraphic units in Vermont
 Paleontology in Vermont

References
 

Cambrian geology of Vermont
Slate formations
Cambrian southern paleotemperate deposits